CAPJPO-Europalestine is a French non-governmental organization (NGO), founded by Olivia Zemor, dedicated to the ending of "the occupation of the Palestinian territories" in compliance with UN Security Council Resolution 242 passed after the Six-Day War in 1967. According to the organization, it was formed by the Coordination des Appels pour une Paix Juste au Proche-Orient, created in February 2002 and signed in less than three months by more than 12,000 people.

Europalestine sees its purpose in pressuring the European Union and the French government in order to force Israel "to respect the resolutions of UN, Geneva Conventions, and the recent ruling by the International Court of Justice of the Hague" declaring the construction of the Israeli West Bank barrier as illegal. Europalestine asserts that any "aid or assistance in maintaining the situation created by such construction" of the barrier is illegal for all States recognizing the International Court of Justice, while parties to the Fourth Geneva Convention have "in addition the obligation to ensure compliance by Israel with international humanitarian law".

In 2002 Europalestine supported the decision voted by the Université Pierre et Marie Curie and the University of Lille to boycott the scientific cooperation agreement between the EU and Israel, on charges that Israel had not respected the article 2 of the agreement.

See also 
International law and the Arab-Israeli conflict
Pierre Vidal-Naquet
Gush Shalom
International Solidarity Movement

External links
 Europalestine's official website

Non-governmental organizations involved in the Israeli–Palestinian peace process